Campillo de Llerena is a municipality located in the province of Badajoz, Extremadura, Spain. According to a 2005 census (INE), the municipality has a population of 1,624 inhabitants.

Situation

Located north of Llerena, located at 46 km, and 128 km of Badajoz.

The municipality is isolated in the Centre of a vast territory of settlements. The soil is hard and the landscape is defined by a terrain where the Plains and the undulations are giving place to a more rugged terrain.

The term covers an area of 234 km² of land. In extension, the people made 27th among the 162 of the province. Belongs to the commerce of the Southern countryside in Badajoz and the judicial branch of Llerena.

Relief

The term is quite mountainous. The village sits on a small hill on a granite outcrop, among a series of hills consisting of cuarcitos Silurian predominate Brown Mediterranean soil and Rotlehm.

The most important elevations are in the east of the term, in a small mountain range called Argallén, branch of Peraleda, moving from North to South. Other unmentionable elevations are the mountains of Cork, Sierra Chica, Sierra del Prado, Cornejo and Cerro Myron, with heights ranging from 550 to 675 m above sea level.

Rocks or best-known rocks: the stone of the Sierpe in the Majadillas, of the friars in la Calera, of the Gaul in the Aflmoches, the rock of the Caserío Dehesilla, and the stones of the drum, the cat and the Castillo, these three very close to the village. All children have played in them, to "civil and thieves." Today this estate has gated its new owners, to the neglect of all.

History

In 1594, written in the Book of the Million, the population census of the provinces and parties of the Crown of Castile in
16th century was part of the province Order of Santiago de Leon and had 404 pecheros neighbors.

The fall of the old system of the town, then known as "'Campillo"', was established in constitutional municipality in the region of Extremadura. It was integrated in the judicial district of Llerena from 1834.

Climate

The climate is Mediterranean, with Atlantic influence, with more accused characters in the dry and hot summer maximum, which in winter minimum. The average annual temperature is about 16 °C, which brings us to define the climate. The average minimum is between 7 and 9 °C, with minimal absolute not often lose 5, the average maximum ranging between 25 and 29 °C, with absolute maximum of the order of 40 °C and sometimes higher.

The was very rare, and produce, is during the months of December and January, not through one or two days. The little good rains have greater intensity during the spring and autumn. The average annual rainfall is about 54 cm. In autumn, especially in the months of September and October, downloadable heavy storms, which also tend to register beforehand, though more weak in May and June.

The dominant winds are Galician or Northwest, South, and the Solano or East; rains usually the bring of the South, and when it blows Northwest produce showers, popularly called.

Hydrographic network

The waterways are low flow drying almost all in summer. The Guadámez River's busiest crosses the West end North with streams flowing into it. Along the left margin are: the pork, Moñigos of the Puercas, Navillas Retamal gauge, and the regajos: of the Moralas and Linare. By the right margin, more numerous and more flow, are: Machicas, Cojitos Garden, Apedreado, Guadamalejo (in the letter of the 1.1 Geographic Institute Edition, from the year 1947, comes as Juan Vencejo, name with which, it is known today), Bejarano, Andibuela, la Calera, Sierra Chica, Zamarra and Santa Maria.

Others to be highlighted are: Borrego, six fingers, Charcón, los Lobos, del Prado, Hill Jewish, Chinese white, the soldier, the blind, the willows, of el Espino, Pedro Serrano of the wicker, Vallehermoso, the Pelona, Fuente del Hierro, Zaucejo, Alberco, pumpkins, Juan Esteban Cañada, Estrello, aunt Luisa, La Calerilla, Argallén Castle of the Loon in the pit, Juan Jimón and el Cañuelo, the latter by passing near the village, is memorable for all Campillejos. Child we played, cut cane and made mischief; of porters we walked as far as its bridge and sitting on the parapet and the young girls, we talked about forward projects that, now of age, with regrets, we remember.

There are no Lakes, but yes lagoons and ponds to remember as of Uncle Hainaut to 1.5 km from the village, on the left side of the road from Peraleda (is now blinded), of the Bujarral in the marriage, of the Commissioner in the Egyptian vultures, of the Guapero in the child of the Garbanzuelo, the eldest of the Raposo.

The supply of water to the population, until last century, was carried out by natural sources and wells. Always are known sources of the path of Llerena and the Palace, close to the population; distant, but appreciated water wells are: of the Machicas and Nino.

Other non drinking water wells are currently used as the source of the cure in the street of the same name, Manantío, in the light and the Rodeo. This, at present, is within the building that is being built to House of culture.

At the end of the Pocico Street on your left side, had a well with steps to make the water more easily. Then he was blinded and instead made a small garden.

In 1836, D. Felix Juan Garrido (priest, native of La Granja de San Ildefonso (province of Segovia), won by opposition of the plaza de Campillo parish priest). In the Albánchez towers of the province of Jaén, of the Priory of Uclés, he took possession on April 1, 1836, good Friday, and left her in 1841.), cured Párroco, the political head of Llerena, complained "of her she decided to neighbors and the apathy of the city, they have a well little healthy and impure water, where the boys throw nasties and dead animals and people draw water with all kinds of vessels "suffering from inflammation of the spleen, obstructions, placenta and flank pain. «Could build a casket covered by putting a few streams with a pillar that they drink the beasts that currently lacks."

Following this complaint, many years later built a pillar that you gave name to the street where he became, with two pipes and drinking trough for animals, where is the source in the Díaz Ambrona Street before Street pillar, whose waters from a spring in the fence owned by Eduardo Romero at the exit for Azuaga.

The path of the Toriles is a well of the bomb, by having a manual pump in a casket for the registration of the conveyance of water to the pillar.

About the year 1926 was built another pillar trough, finding in active at the end of the street Castejón, pouring water from a covered spring, according to tradition is an Arab cistern which lies at the end of the Solana Street and beginning of the path of Llerena.

During the administration of Mayor D. Antonio Fernández Otero (D. Antonio Fernández Otero was Mayor for many years, and during his tenure began the paving of the streets, and built the barracks, cemetery, sewage waste and the Civic Center among others.) the year 1954, opened four deep wells with the stream of the Prado on the hunger site, to 5,33 km, settling seven public fountains by the people, which was held and celebrated with great joy, starting the entry of water into homes.

In the 1960s, motivated by the poverty of the springs, by prolonged droughts and the increase in consumption, the veneros were very depleted, creating the need for new springs. After laborious efforts and search for new possibilities, the experts are decided by the construction of a dam in the Guadámez River, 4 km away, close to the bridge on the road of Retamal.

The dam was inaugurated in 1977, but through lack of foresight or expertise, the water has failed to supply. First was because actual fecal water in the swamp, being normal rejection of population to consume the water in these conditions. Once corrected this problem, clorar the waters they took a dark color that was apparently due to the terrain where the reservoir is very rusty. Thus they were forced to build a new sewage treatment plant at the site of the valleys to bring water to a new process and try to make it fit for consumption. The different chemicals that have tried have failed or at least do not succeed at a social cost. Owner in the effort, the swamp, with all the millions invested in its construction, only serves to satisfy the fans of a fisherman or for nesting waterfowl.

Before the pressing need to find as basic element, such as water, five holes in the same place where are the old wells that for many years supplied the people were given, but the results were negative.

On the initiative of Agustín Izquierdo Sanchez, natural forests Helechosa and resident of this village, thanks to faith and tenacity, and many people believed was stubbornness and ignorance, performed new drills close to the previous ones, but on the opposite side of the stream of the prado, exposing a good source of water quality through a short pipe is pumped up the old facilities at a minimal costbeing the water consumed, covering needs, from August 9, 1981. To Mr Izquierdo, later was feted with a well-deserved tribute.

Negotiating are currently with other nearby villages to bring water from the River Zújar. In 2007, most of the water consumed in Campillo de Llerena is supplied from the reservoir of la Serena, brings to some tanks installed in the farm the valleys, and from there it is distributed to the population.

Urban topography

The houses are Andalusian whitewashed usually whitewashed façades with balconies and iron Windows and roofs to two aspects of regular inclination or rifan type. They consist of two floors, the lower used as housing and of above called 'doblao', was used to save the tools of farmhouse or barn. Currently, they are becoming homes. These houses were formerly stables for the horses, or the partly rear or attached to one side of the housing. Currently they are not necessary and they are becoming garage or warehouse.

Economy

Stop population is often a result of the progress of the economy of the area that is settled, and it depends in turn of existing natural resources, structural policy, and the own-initiative of the people, i.e., is a process in a circle that can be opened by those with decision-making power. The important thing is to know which is the current situation in each sector, glimpse the needs of certain goods and services, to try to take advantage of market gaps.

The productive structure of Campillo responds to the schema of an area with a medium-low development level. It is characterized by the high weight of trade to the minor, and a considerable importance of construction and auxiliary companies because, in recent years, being key drivers for the creation of employment in the locality.

Agriculture

A municipality as Campillo, located in a mainly agricultural and livestock, could not have a significant primary sector in its economy.

The abundant grazing has allow also the development of an important cottage of the pig (52.3%) and something less than sheep (35.4%).

Most of the rural area is dedicated to pastures (29.6%), still well below the number of cultivated land. Crops include oats (17.6%) in rainfed and irrigated oilseed rape (46.2%) and the Sunflower (40%).

The land is usually distributed in holdings (46.7 per cent of farms are under 5 hectares). Most common tenure regimes are the direct exploitation of the land by the owner (68.7 enumerated surface). Holders are mostly elderly between 55 and 65 (33.6 per cent) and being his main occupation only in exploitation (58.7%).

Another aspect important to take into account when concluding what the State and prospects for the sector is the level of mechanization, which del Campillo is optimal.

Services

The majority of companies that can fit in this sector are related to the primary needs and leisure satisfaction. Thus, firstly appear dedicated to trade to the retail non-food products, followed by the food.

On the other hand, within the sector services have mentioned the catering trade, in the section on restaurants, bars and hotels there are 13 in number.

There is a group of 8 professionals that offer their services independently, classifying them into the category of professional activities (commercial agents, medical, veterinary, lawyers)

Construction

Mentioning the strong weight of construction firms: 20 autonomous in its majority, to which they do interact with other industries and the auxiliary construction-related leads us to conclude by saying that it is this sector that supports a large weight of all the industrial fabric of the town.

It is detected in the last three years in the construction sector declined although slowed down a bit in the last year by the regional policy of encouraging her construction or repair of houses. However the wisdom of experts anticipated that construction will grow less in 1999 in the next two years.

"Total vehicles registered: 745."

In the past three years, the total number of vehicles registered in Campillo de Llerena has grown by more than 10%, namely an 11.9 per cent. This fact called attention due to the large number of vehicles in relation to the population, since we can say that there is an average of 1.2 cars per family, which contrasts with the high percentage of unemployed people may be thinking that there are other "submerged" income generating additional income, or who have exploited the good employment prospects added to lower rates of interest on loans.

References 

Municipalities in the Province of Badajoz